William Henry Benson (1893-1968) was an Australian rugby league footballer who played in the 1910s and 1920s.

Career
Bill "Binghi" Benson was a pioneer halfback in the early years of the NSWRFL. He played halfback for the Glebe Dirty Reds for ten seasons between 1916 and 1924.  Benson played in the 1922 NSWRL grand final for Glebe against North Sydney which ended in a 35–3 loss at the Sydney Cricket Ground.

Benson then switched to St. George for his final season with his Glebe team-mate Frank Burge, and the two of them took St George to the 1927 Final after the club got the wooden spoon the year before. He represented New South Wales on five occasions between 1921 and 1924, but was never selected to play for Australia.

Death
A resident of Forest Lodge, New South Wales for his entire life, Benson died after watching a world cup match between Australia and England at the Sydney Cricket Ground on 25 May 1968. He was aged 75. His funeral was held two days later and he was cremated at Woronora Crematorium, Sutherland, New South Wales

References

1893 births
1968 deaths
Glebe rugby league players
St. George Dragons players
Australian rugby league players
New South Wales rugby league team players
Rugby league halfbacks
Rugby league players from Sydney